Yewforest was a  coaster that was built as Empire Fenchurch in 1945 by John Lewis & Sons Ltd, Aberdeen for the Ministry of Transport (MoT). She was sold in 1946 and renamed Yewforest. She was sold to Guernsey in 1954 and renamed Perelle. Sold for scrapping in 1961, she was converted to a barge in 1962 and was in service as Tor in 1965.

Description
The ship was a coaster built in 1945 by John Lewi & Sons Ltd, Aberdeen, United Kingdom. She was yard number 187.

The engine was built by John Lewis & Sons Ltd. It drove a single screw propeller.

History
The ship was built by John Lewis & Sons Ltd, Aberdeen, United Kingdom. She was launched on 6 November 1945 and completed in February 1946. Built for the MoT, she was placed under the management of John Stewart & Co (Shipping) Ltd. The United Kingdom Official Number 180995 and Code Letters GKQF were allocated. Her port of registry was Aberdeen.

Empire Fenchurch was sold in 1946 to John Stewart & Co (Shipping) Ltd. In 1954, Yewforest was sold to O Dorey & Sons Ltd, Guernsey, Channel Islands and was renamed Perelle. She was towed to Gothenburg, Sweden in 1961 for scrapping but was leased out as a floating warehouse in Denmark. In 1962, she was cut down to a barge and was renamed Tor. She was still in service in 1965.

References

1945 ships
Ships built in Aberdeen
Empire ships
Merchant ships of the United Kingdom
Steamships of the United Kingdom